Ngozi Ukazu is an American cartoonist and graphic novelist. In 2013, she created the webcomic Check, Please!, which later became a New York Times-bestselling graphic novel.

Early life and education 
Ukazu grew up in Houston, Texas. She attended Bellaire High School, where she contributed to the school’s newspaper, The Three Penny Press, as the comics editor. She is the daughter of Nigerian parents. She studied computer science, obtaining a degree in Computing and The Arts from Yale University in 2013 and earned a masters degree in Sequential Art from the Savannah College of Art and Design in 2015.

Career 
Ukazu launched Check, Please! as a webcomic in 2013 after writing a screenplay about Eric "Bitty" Bittle, a gay college freshman and champion figure skater who joins a hockey team.

Ukazu created a Kickstarter campaign in 2015 to print the first volume of the comic; the campaign resulted in the highest-funded comics project in Kickstarter's history. In 2018, the first installment, Check, Please!: #Hockey, was published by First Second Books. The sequel, Check, Please!: Sticks & Scones, was a New York Times bestseller in May 2020.

Publications 

 2018: Check, Please!: #Hockey
 2020: Check, Please!: Sticks & Scones

Awards and honors 

 2019 Ignatz Award - Winner, Outstanding Comic
 2019 Harvey Award - Winner, Digital Book of the Year
 2019 YALSA - Finalist | William C. Morris Award
 2018 The Boston Globe - Best YA of 2018
 2018 Kirkus Reviews - Best Young Adult Books of 2018 That Explore Family and Self
 2018 New York Public Library’s Best Books - Top Ten Books For Teens
 2018 Best of Austin - Arts & Entertainment Critics Pick
 2018 Harvey Awards - Nominee, Digital Book of the Year
 2017 National Cartoonists Society - Winner, Best Online Comic: Long Form
 2017 NPR - 100 Favorite Comics And Graphic Novels

References 

Living people
American women cartoonists
American webcomic creators
Savannah College of Art and Design alumni
Yale University alumni
Bellaire High School (Bellaire, Texas) alumni
People from Houston
American people of Nigerian descent
African-American comics creators
African-American women artists
Ignatz Award winners
American graphic novelists
Harvey Award winners
21st-century American novelists
Year of birth missing (living people)
American women novelists
American cartoonists
The New Yorker people
21st-century American women writers
African-American novelists